Alexander is a 1996 Indian Tamil-language action film directed by Keyaar. The film stars Vijayakanth and Sangita. It was released on 10 November 1996, during Diwali, and was an average grosser at box office.

Plot

Ashok's brothers smuggle drugs and are unstoppable. Only Alexander, a CBI officer, can arrest them.

Cast
Vijayakanth as Alexander
Sangita as Priya
Prakash Raj as Ashok
Srihari as Hari
Kavita as Thayamma 
Jeeva as Brinda
Nizhalgal Ravi as Gandhirajan
Vadivukkarasi as Lakshmi
Rajasekhar as Rajasekhar 
Laxmi Rattan as Choudary 
Aditya Kumar
Bobby

Soundtrack
The music was composed by Karthik Raja, with lyrics written by Vaali, Panchu Arunachalam and Parthi Bhaskar.

Reception
R. P. R. of Kalki called Prakash Raj the film's biggest strength, and also appreciated Karthik Raja's score.

References

External links

1996 films
1990s Tamil-language films
Central Bureau of Investigation in fiction
Films directed by Keyaar
Films scored by Karthik Raja